John Justin (24 November 1917 – 29 November 2002) was a British stage and film actor.

Early life
John Justinian de Ledesma was born in Knightsbridge, London, England, the son of a well-off Argentine rancher. Though he grew up on his father's ranch, he was educated at Bryanston School in Bryanston, Dorset. He developed an interest in flying and became a qualified pilot at the age of 12, though he was not allowed to fly solo at the time because of his age.

Acting career
He became interested in acting at a young age. By the age of 16, he had joined the Plymouth Repertory. In 1937, he briefly trained with the Royal Academy of Dramatic Art, but did not like it and soon joined the repertory company of John Gielgud. Among the plays he appeared in was Dear Octopus.

The Thief of Bagdad
In 1938, he auditioned for and was cast the role for which he is perhaps best remembered, Ahmad in the 1940 version of The Thief of Bagdad, opposite Sabu. To do so, he had to sign a seven-year contract with Alexander Korda.

Second World War
The Second World War broke out during the film's production. After completing the picture, Justin joined the Royal Air Force, serving as a test pilot and flying instructor. He was injured in a crash.

He was given leave to work on two films, The Gentle Sex (1943) with Leslie Howard, and Journey Together (1944), an RAF feature film with a cast led by Richard Attenborough, Jack Watling, David Tomlinson, and Edward G. Robinson. Bessie Love, whose career began in the silent era, also appeared in the cast.

Post-war
With the war's end, Justin returned to acting. In 1948, he did a stint at the Shakespeare Memorial Theatre, Stratford-on-Avon, appearing in King John, The Merchant of Venice, The Winter's Tale, Othello, Hamlet, and Troilus and Cressida. He also made the film Call of the Blood (1948).

In 1949, he appeared on stage in Peter Pan and was in Antigone on the BBC. Justin was in Return to Tyassi (1950) on the West End and appeared in The Angel with the Trumpet (1950).

Justin appeared in the film The Sound Barrier (1952) and played the lead in Hot Ice (1952). After appearing in Uncle Vanya (1952) on stage, he focused on film work.

He was in The Village (1953), a Swiss film; Melba (1953), a biopic; King of the Khyber Rifles (1954), a Hollywood film with Tyrone Power for 20th Century Fox; Seagulls Over Sorrento (1954) with Gene Kelly. Then he had two leading roles, in The Teckman Mystery (1954) with Margaret Leighton and The Man Who Loved Redheads (1955) with Moira Shearer.

Fox called him back for Untamed (1955) and Warwick Films used him in Safari (1956) with Victor Mature. Justin had a good role in Fox's Island in the Sun (1957), romancing Dorothy Dandridge.

In 1957, he appeared on stage in Dinner with the Family. In 1959 he joined the Old Vic, where his plays included The Double Dealer, As You Like It, and The Importance of Being Earnest.

He made his Broadway debut in 1960 in the play Little Moon of Alban and was in The Spider's Web (1960). He was later in stage productions of Much Ado About Nothing (1963), Death of a Salesman (1965), and As You Like It (1965).

Between 1963 and 1970 he made no film appearances. In 1968 he played Thorin Oakenshield in the BBC Radio adaptation of The Hobbit.

Later career
On stage he was in Lulu (1971), toured South Africa in Who Killed Santa Claus? (1971), was in Old Fruit (1974), A Man And His Wife (1974)

Later films included Ken Russell's Savage Messiah (1972), Lisztomania (1975) and Valentino (1977).

In 1979, he played the ghoulish lover in the BBC's Christmas ghost story Schalcken the Painter, based on the 1839 story Strange Event in the Life of Schalken the Painter by Sheridan Le Fanu.

His love was for the stage. He called his film career "a mistake".

Personal life
Justin was married three times, first to dancer and choreographer Pola Nirenska. His second marriage, to actress Barbara Murray, lasted from 1952 to 1964; they had three daughters. From 1970 to his death in 2002, he was married to Alison McMurdo.

Complete filmography

The Thief of Bagdad (1940) - Ahmad
The Gentle Sex (1943) - Flying Officer David Sheridan
Journey Together (1945) - Flying Instructor, Flying Grading School
No Alibi (1947, Short) - Pilot
Ridgeway's Late Joys (1947, TV)
Call of the Blood (1949) - David Erskine
Antigone (1949, live TV drama) - Haemon
The Angel with the Trumpet (1950) - Paul Alt
The World of Light (1950, live TV drama) - Bill Hamblin
Rush Job (1951, live TV drama) - Tom Stevenson
The Sound Barrier (1952) - Philip Peel
Hot Ice (1952) - Jim Henderson
The Village (1953) - Alan Manning
Melba (1953) - Eric Walton
King of the Khyber Rifles (1953) - Lt. Geoffrey Heath
Sacrifice to the Wind (1954, live TV drama) - Ulysses
Seagulls Over Sorrento (1954) - Lt. Roger Wharton
The Teckman Mystery (1954) - Philip Chance
The Man Who Loved Redheads (1955) - Mark St. Neots, Lord Binfield
Untamed (1955) - Shawn Kildare
Guilty? (1956) - Nap Rumbold
Safari (1956) - Brian Sinden
Island in the Sun (1957) - Denis Archer
 The Widow of Bath (1959, TV series) - Hugh Everton
The Spider's Web (1960) - Henry Hailsham-Brown
Les hommes veulent vivre (Man Wants to Live) (1961) - Carter
Candidate for Murder (1962) - Robert Vaughan
La Salamandre d'or (1962) - Vandoeuvre
Savage Messiah (1972) - Lionel Shaw
La redada (Barcelona Kill) (1973) - Comisario Mendoza
Lisztomania (1975) - Count d'Agoult
Valentino (1977) - Sidney Olcott
The Big Sleep (1978) - Arthur Geiger
Schalcken the Painter (1979, TV Movie) - Vanderhausen
Very Like a Whale (1980, TV Movie) - Party Guest
Timon of Athens (1981, TV Movie) - Second Senator
Trenchcoat (1983) - Marquis De Pena
Good at Art (1983, TV Movie) - Mr. Jones (final film role)
Sabu: The Elephant Boy (1993, documentary) - Himself

References

External links

1917 births
2002 deaths
20th-century English male actors 
Alumni of RADA
English people of Argentine descent 
British actors of Latin American descent
British people of Argentine descent
English male stage actors
English male film actors
English test pilots
Male actors from London
People educated at Bryanston School
Royal Air Force pilots of World War II